The St. Louis Car Company was a major United States manufacturer of railroad passenger cars, streetcars, interurbans, trolleybuses and locomotives that existed from 1887 to 1974, based in St. Louis, Missouri.

History
The St. Louis Car Company was formed in April 1887 to manufacture and sell streetcars and other kinds of rolling stock of street and steam railways supporting the traction industry. In succeeding years the company built automobiles, including the American Mors, the Skelton, and the Standard Six. The St. Louis Aircraft Corporation division of the company partnered with the Huttig Sash and Door company in 1917 to produce aircraft. During the two world wars, the company manufactured gliders, trainers, alligators, flying boats, and dirigible gondolas.  Among their most successful products were the Birney Safety Car and the PCC streetcar, a design that was very popular at the time.

The firm went on to build some of the vehicles used in the transit systems of New York City and Chicago, as well as the FM OP800 railcars manufactured exclusively for the Southern Railway in 1939.

The St. Louis Car Company was headed by Edwin B. Meissner Sr., who died at age 71 on Sept. 12, 1956. Meissner was president of the company, one of the nation’s largest manufacturers of railroad and light rail cars, and the St. Louis Aircraft Corporation. He was active for many years on the Jewish Federation Board of Directors, and served for over 20 years as President of Congregation Shaare Emeth.

The St. Louis Car Co., later known as General Steel Industries, manufactured St. Louis streetcars and trolleys and cars for far-flung transit systems such as the Paris Metro in France. Meissner’s son, Edwin B. Meissner Jr., succeeded his father as head of the company, and continues to be an active member of Congregation Shaare Emeth.

Streetcars held sway in St. Louis and its suburbs from the 1880s until the mid- and late 1940s. Andrew Young records that new state-of-the-art buses began to encroach on the streetcars domain. New streamlined streetcars were brought into service in 1946 to replace older cars, some dating back to 1903.

In 1960, St. Louis Car Company was acquired by General Steel Industries.  In 1964, St. Louis Car completed an order of 430 World's Fair picture-window cars (R36 WF) for the New York City Subway and was building 162 PA-1s (110 single units, 52 trailers) for the Port Authority of New York and New Jersey for their use on the Port Authority Trans-Hudson line to New Jersey.  Also in the mid-1960s, the company completed building the passenger capsules, designed by Planet Corporation, to ferry visitors to the top of the Gateway Arch at the Gateway Arch National Park (then known as the Jefferson National Expansion Memorial) in St. Louis, Missouri.

St. Louis Car continued business until 1968 and ceased operations in 1974.  The final St. Louis Car products were R44 subway cars for the New York City Subway and Staten Island Rapid Transit, and the USDOT State of the Art Car rapid transit demonstrator set whose design was based on the R44.

The St. Louis Car assembly plant and general office at 8000 Hall Street, St. Louis is now the St. Louis Business Center, a mixed use industrial and commercial complex redeveloped starting in 2005.

Selected Products 

 PCC streetcars (1935-1952)
 Peter Witt streetcars
 Trolley buses
 Interurban cars
 Gas-electric railcars
 CRT/CTA 5003-5004 PCC elevated-subway cars (1947) - retired 1985
 CTA 6000-series PCC elevated-subway cars (1950–59) - retired 1992
 CTA 1-50 PCC elevated-subway cars (1959–60) - retired 1999
 Chicago North Shore and Milwaukee Railroad Electroliner (1941)
 Electro-Motive Company (EMD) gas-electric railcars - car body shells  (1920s)
 Fairbanks-Morse  experimental center cab diesel switchers and FM OP800 railcars (1939)
 GCRTA Red Line "Bluebirds" (1954–55, 1958)
 MBTA #3 East Boston Tunnel cars (1951)
 State of the Art Car heavy rail transit demonstrator set for USDOT (1972–74) - now at Seashore Trolley Museum
 Illinois Terminal Railroad Streamliners (1948–50)
 IRT World's Fair Steinway Motors (1938) - built for 1939 World's Fair
 Metra Illinois Central Electric District Highliner electric MU cars (1971–72)
 NJ Transit/NJDOT/Penn Central Arrow I (PRR MP85E6) electric MU cars - push-pull coach conversion (1968)
 New York Central ACMU 4500 series (1950–51)
 NYCT R8A (1939)
 NYCT R17 (1954–55)
 NYCT R21  (1956–57)
 NYCT R22 (1957–58)
 NYCT R27 (1960–61)
 NYCT R29  (1962)
 NYCT R30 (1961–62)
 NYCT R33  (1962–63)
 NYCT R33S (1963)
 NYCT R36 (1963–64)
 NYCT R38 (1966–67)
 NYCT R40 (1967–68)
 NYCT R40A (1968–69)
 NYCT R42 (1969–70)
 NYCT R44 (1971–73)
 Chicago and North Western Transportation Company Gallery 7600 series coaches #1-16 (1955)
 Pacific Electric "Hollywood" cars (1920s)
 Philadelphia and Western Railroad original wood cars and freight motors (1907)
 Hudson & Manhattan Railroad/PATH "K-car"/MP51 (1958)
 PATH PA1 (1965) & PA2 (1967)
 San Diego Class 1 Streetcars (1910-1912)
 Seaboard Air Line 2027-2028 Railcars (1936)
 SEPTA Silverliner III (PRR MP85)  cars (1967)
 Staten Island Railway R44 (1973) (last St. Louis cars)
 U.S. Army (USAX) cars - various types including coaches, ambulance, cafeteria, sleepers
 Union Pacific lightweight passenger cars, express and baggage cars (1960–65)
 Victorian Railways Petrol Electric railmotor (1928)

See also 

 Brownell Car Company
 Canada Car and Foundry
 Canadian Vickers
 F-Market & Wharves Streetcar Line
 John I. Beggs
 List of rolling stock manufacturers
 New York City Subway rolling stock
 Ottawa Car Company

References 

 Middleton, William, Jr. The Interurban Era. Kalmbach Publishing, Milwaukee, WI.

External links 

 Builders of wooden railway cars: St. Louis Car Company from ironhorse129.com — some photos of early SLCC cars.
 St. Louis Car Company Records, 1887-1997 | WUA University Archives at Washington University in St. Louis (html)
 St. Louis Car Company history at Mid-Continent Railway Museum, North Freedom, Wisconsin
 www.cablecarmuseum.org at Cable Car Museum, San Francisco, CA
 www.streetcar.org at Market Street Railway, San Francisco, CA

Electric vehicle manufacturers of the United States
Bus manufacturers of the United States
Defunct locomotive manufacturers of the United States
Defunct rolling stock manufacturers of the United States
Tram manufacturers
Trolleybus manufacturers
Manufacturing companies based in St. Louis
American companies established in 1887
Vehicle manufacturing companies established in 1887
Vehicle manufacturing companies disestablished in 1974
1887 establishments in Missouri
1974 disestablishments in Missouri
Defunct companies based in Missouri